The 1990 First Union 400 was the seventh stock car race of the 1990 NASCAR Winston Cup Series season and the 40th iteration of the event. The race was held on Sunday, April 22, 1990, in North Wilkesboro, North Carolina at the North Wilkesboro Speedway, a  oval short track. The race took the scheduled 400 laps to complete. At race's end, King Racing driver Brett Bodine would benefit from a late race caution and pull away in the late stages of the race to take his first and only career NASCAR Winston Cup Series victory and his only victory of the season. To fill out the podium, Hendrick Motorsports driver Darrell Waltrip and Richard Childress Racing driver Dale Earnhardt would finish second and third, respectively.

The race would become controversial after a late race caution came out for Kenny Wallace during the last round of green flag pit stops. Many had thought that during when the pace car had came out and the leaders had raced to the caution, that Dale Earnhardt was in the lead. However, after NASCAR officials had spent more than 20 laps sorting out the restart order, they determined that Brett Bodine was in the lead. Bodine would then cruise to his only victory of his career. Despite numerous protests from competitors, the victory still remains official to this day.

Background 

North Wilkesboro Speedway is a short oval racetrack located on U.S. Route 421, about five miles east of the town of North Wilkesboro, North Carolina, or 80 miles north of Charlotte. It measures  and features a unique uphill backstretch and downhill frontstretch. It has previously held races in NASCAR's top three series, including 93 Winston Cup Series races. The track, a NASCAR original, operated from 1949, NASCAR's inception, until the track's original closure in 1996. The speedway briefly reopened in 2010 and hosted several stock car series races before closing again in the spring of 2011. It was re-opened in August 2022 for grassroots racing.

Entry list 

 (R) denotes rookie driver.

Qualifying 
Qualifying was split into two rounds. The first round was held on Friday, April 20, at 3:00 PM EST. Each driver would have one lap to set a time. During the first round, the top 10 drivers in the round would be guaranteed a starting spot in the race. If a driver was not able to guarantee a spot in the first round, they had the option to scrub their time from the first round and try and run a faster lap time in a second round qualifying run, held on Saturday, April 21, at 12:15 PM EST. As with the first round, each driver would have one lap to set a time.

Three drivers would fail to qualify: J. D. McDuffie, Bill Sedgwick, and Freddie Crawford.

Full qualifying results 

*Time not available.

Race results

Standings after the race 

Drivers' Championship standings

Note: Only the first 10 positions are included for the driver standings.

References 

1990 NASCAR Winston Cup Series
NASCAR races at North Wilkesboro Speedway
April 1990 sports events in the United States
1990 in sports in North Carolina